Văn Phụng (Hanoi, 1930–17 December 1999) was a Vietnamese songwriter. His wife is the singer Châu Hà.

Works

Ave Maria
Bên lưng đèo
Bóng người đi
Bức họa đồng quê
Các anh đi
Chán nản
Chung thủy
Đêm buồn
Điệp khúc thanh bình
Dịu dàng
Em mới biết yêu đã biết sầu
Ghé bến Sài Gòn
Giã từ đêm mưa
Giấc mộng viễn du
Giang hồ
Hát lên nào
Hết đêm nay mai sẽ hay
Hình ảnh một đêm trăng
Hoài vọng
Hôn nhau lần cuối
Lãng tử
Lối cũ
Lời nhi nữ
Mộng hải hồ
Một lần cuối
Mộng viễn du
Mưa
Mưa rơi thánh thót
Mưa trên phím ngà
Nhớ bến Đà Giang
Nỗi buồn
Ô! Mê ly
Sóng vàng trên vịnh Nha Trang
Spring of hair guitar solo piece
Suối tóc
Sương thu
Ta vui ca vang
Thuyền xưa bến cũ
Tiếng dương cầm
Tiếng hát đường xa
Tiếng hát với cung đàn
Tiếng vang trên đồi
Tiếng vọng chiều vàng
Tình
Tôi đi giữa hoàng hôn
Trăng gió ngoài khơi
Trăng sáng vườn chè
Trăng sơn cước
Trở về cố đô
Trở về Huế
Trong đêm vắng
Viết trên tà áo Em
Vó câu muôn dặm
Vui bên ánh lửa
Vui đời nghệ sĩ
Xuân họp mặt
Xuân miền Nam
Xuân thôn giã
Xuân về trên non sông Việt Nam
Yêu

References

Vietnamese musicians
1930 births
1999 deaths